Benoît Duquesne (19 July 1957 – 4 July 2014) was a French journalist, television reporter and newscaster. He worked as presenter of the news magazine Complément d'enquête from 2007 until his death. He also was anchor of the Journal de 13 heures on France 2 from January to July 2005.

Early life and education 
His family was from Wasquehal and his origin is from Glageon. His father, Gérard Duquesne, a doctor and the mayor of the town, had seven children. Benoît Duquesne was educated at the primary school of Couplevoie and at the Lycée Saint-Joseph of Reims for his secondary studies. After graduating with a degree in law, hé studied at the ESJ (École supérieure de journalisme) of Lille where he graduated in 1983.

Television career 
From 1982 to 1988, he was a reporter on Europe 1, and then joined TF1 until 1994. He worked for the news magazines A la une, Le Droit de savoir and Reportages. From 1994 to 1997, he is the replacing presenter of the news on France 2. On the evening of the second round of the presidential election of 1995, in direct on France 2, he attempts to obtain by motorcycle the impressions of the winner Jacques Chirac from his car. He is then in charge of exceptional reportings on France 2 until 1999. In the meantime, from 1995 to 2000, he is the correspondent in London. From 2000 to 2001, he is the editor-in-chief.

From September 2001 until his death, he presents the investigation magazine Complément d'enquête on France 2. From January to July 2005, he presents the Journal de 13 heures on the same channel after the sudden departure of Christophe Hondelatte. In September 2007, he was named news editor on Europe 1. He was acknowledged in July 2008 by Alexandre Bompard.

Death 
Benoît Duquesne died of a heart attack, in his houseboat of L'Île-Saint-Denis, Seine-Saint-Denis on July 4, 2014. His funeral was celebrated on July 10, 2014, at the Église Sainte-Jeanne-d'Arc in Versailles.

Personal life 
Benoît Duquesne was father of four children. His daughter, Marie Duquesne, is a journalist on BFM TV.

Television programs 
 1992–94 : À la une, Le Droit de savoir and Reportages on France 2
 1994–99 : replacing presenter of the news on France 2
 2001–14 : Complément d'enquête on France 2
 2005 : Journal de 13 heures on France 2

References 

1957 births
2014 deaths
People from Roubaix
French journalists
French television presenters
French male non-fiction writers